The battle of Ming Sha was a major battle between the Tang Dynasty and Second Turkic Khaganate which occurred in 707.

Battle
Kul Tigin and Bilge Qaghan were also present in the Göktürk army under the command of Qapaghan Qaghan. The Göktürks attacked the. Here, the 80.000 strong Tang army under the command of Caca, sent by the Tang Dynasty against the Göktürks in Kul Tigin inscription, Kul Tigin’s role in the war is described as follows:

When Caca realized that he would be defeated, he fled from the battle. Some sources mentioned that 30.000 Chinese soldiers died, also Bilge Qaghan said that he destroyed his army. This battle is mentioned in Kul Tigin inscription.

In another Göktürk inscription, the Bilge Qaghan inscription, this battle is mentioned as follows:

References 

 Ahmetbeyoglu, Ali (2015). Ancient Turkish History with Questions. Istanbul: Yeditepe Publishing House. P. 111. ISBN 978-605-5200-41-1.

Military history of the Göktürks
Battles involving China